The Denial of Saint Peter is a 1650 painting of the Denial of Peter by Georges de La Tour, possibly with some assistance from the painter's son Étienne. It was signed and dated by the senior artist. In 1810 it was acquired from François Cacault by the musée d'Arts de Nantes, where it still hangs.

The work was commissioned by Henri de La Ferté-Senneterre, governor of Lorraine, where La Tour lived and worked. de La Ferté-Senneterre is recorded as paying 650 francs for a work entitled The Denial of St Peter in 1650, possibly the work now in Nantes. He was then one of the most important collectors of La Tour's work.

The work's approach is very Caravagist, sidelining the work's supposed main subject and placing the soldiers gaming at a table at its centre. In 17th century French society, "gaming was inseparable from luxury" and was evidence of "indifference to salvation" - a similar link is made in the artist's The Card Sharp with the Ace of Diamonds, contemporary with Tristan L'Hermite's The Disgraced Page. The gaming soldiers also refer forwards in time to those casting lots for Jesus' clothing at the foot of the cross.

References

Bibliography 
 
 

Paintings by Georges de La Tour
Paintings depicting Saint Peter
1650 paintings
Paintings in the collection of the Musée d'Arts de Nantes